Mahmudabad (also Romanized as Maḩmūdābād; also known as Nūrī Kandī) is a village in Arshaq-e Gharbi Rural District, Moradlu District, Meshgin Shahr County, Ardabil Province, Iran. At the 2006 census, its population was 166, in 42 families.

References 

Towns and villages in Meshgin Shahr County